Monkton Swifts are a Welsh football club from Monkton, Pembroke, Pembrokeshire in the southwest of Wales. They spent six seasons in the Welsh Football League from 1994–95 to 1999–2000. The club currently play in the Pembrokeshire League Division One. They have been champions of this league on five occasions, the last of which was in 2018–19.

History

A pre World War Two team existed called Monkton United, records of which exist with the team playing in 1926.  On 5 December 1955, a meeting was held in Monkton Church Hall with the aim to form a new football club which it was hoped would be entered in the Pembrokeshire League for the 1956–57 season.

Honours

 Pembrokeshire League Division One  - Champions (5): 2003–04; 2004–05; 2005–06; 2006–07; 2018–19
 Pembrokeshire League Division One  - Runners-Up (4): 1975–76; 1978–79; 1993–94; 2019–20
 Pembrokeshire League Division Two  - Champions (6): 1961–62; 1969–70; 1994–95; 1995–96; 2010–11; 2015–16
 Pembrokeshire League Division Two  - Runners-Up (3): 1964–65; 1968–69; 1992–93 (second team)
 Pembrokeshire League Division Three  - Champions (2): 1999–2000; 2019–20 (second team)
 Pembrokeshire League Division Three  - Runners-Up (2): 1975–76 (second team); 1990–91 (second team)
 Pembrokeshire League Division Five  - Champions (1): 1992–93 (third team)
 Pembrokeshire League Reserves Division One - Champions (2): 2003–04; 2006–07
 Pembrokeshire League Reserves Division One - Runners-Up (2): 2004–05; 2005–06
 Pembrokeshire League Reserves Division Two - Champions (1): 1998–99
 Pembrokeshire Senior Cup - Winners (4): 1976–77; 1980–81; 1992–93; 2006-07
 Pembrokeshire Senior Cup - Runners-Up (4):  1974–75; 2003–04; 2007–08; 2011-12

Welsh Football League history
Information in this section is sourced from the Football Club History Database and the Welsh Soccer Archive.

Notes

References

External links
Official club Facebook
Official club Twitter

Football clubs in Wales
Sport in Pembrokeshire
Pembrokeshire League clubs
Welsh Football League clubs
Association football clubs established in 1955
1955 establishments in Wales